Los alegres Aguilares ("The Cheerful Aguilares") is a 1967 Mexican film. It stars Antonio Aguilar.

The adventurer Manuel comes across Carlos, who is almost his identical twin. Manuel comes from a rich family so he offers Carlos some money to pass himself off as him for a young woman that wants to marry him. Carlos asks him to return the favor.
Starring: Antonio Aguilar, Crox Alvarado
Directed by: Miguel Zacarias
Runtime: 1 hour 37 minutes
Release year: 1905
Studio: Veranda Entertainment

External links
 

1967 films
Mexican Western (genre) comedy films
1960s Spanish-language films
1960s Mexican films